Cryptophagus setulosus is a species of silken fungus beetle in the family Cryptophagidae. It is found in North America and Europe.

References

Further reading

 
 

Cryptophagidae
Articles created by Qbugbot
Beetles described in 1845